Nationality words link to articles with information on the nation's poetry or literature (for instance, Irish or France).

Events
April 23 – Opening of Folger Shakespeare Library in Washington, D.C.
April 26 – 32-year-old American poet Hart Crane throws himself overboard from the steamship Orizaba in the Gulf of Mexico en route from Mexico to New York in a state of alcoholic depression; his body is never recovered.
July – W. B. Yeats leases Riversdale house in the Dublin suburb of Rathfarnham.
In Vietnam, the New Poetry (Thơ mới) period begins, marked by an article and a poem of Phan Khôi, inaugurating modern literature in that country
T. S. Eliot begins his 1932–33 Charles Eliot Norton Lectures at Harvard University (published in 1933 as The Use of Poetry and the Use of Criticism).

Works published in English

Canada
 Dorothy Livesay, Signpost. Toronto: Macmillan.
 E. J. Pratt, Many Moods, Toronto: Macmillan.
 W. W. E. Ross, Sonnets.

India, in English

 Govind Krishna Chettur:
 Gumataraya and other Sonnets for all Moods, Mangalore: Basel Mission Bookshop
 The Temple tank and Other Poems, Mangalore: Basel Mission Bookshop
 The Triumph of Love: A Sonnet Sequence, Mangalore: Basel Mission Bookshop
 Baldoon Dhingra, Beauty's Sanctuary, Lahore: Civil and Military Gazette Press
 Theodore W. La Touche, The Lion Kings of Lanka, Secunderabad: self-published
 Manjeri Sundaraman Manjeri, Saffron and Gold and Other Poems, Madras: Shakti Karyalayam
 Nanikram Vasanmal Thadani, The Garden of the East, Karachi: Bharat Publishing House

United Kingdom

 Æ, pen name of George William Russell, Song and its Fountains
 Edmund Blunden, Halfway House
 W. H. Auden, The Orators: An English study
 Roy Campbell, Pomegranates
 W. H. Davies, Poems, 1930–31
 Lord Alfred Douglas and others, ed. by John Gawsworth, Known Signatures: new poems
 Lawrence Durrell, Ten Poems
 T. S. Eliot, Selected Essays 1917–1932, criticism
 Thomas Hardy, Collected Poems
 Julian Huxley, The Captive Shrew and other Poems of a Biologist
 F. R. Leavis,  New Bearings in English Poetry attacks late Victorian and Georgian poetry and praises Ezra Pound, T. S. Eliot, and other modernists
 Hugh MacDiarmid, pen name of Christopher Murray Grieve, Second Hymn to Lenin, and Other Poems
 William Plomer, The Fivefold Screen
 Aeneas Francon Williams, Dream Drift, by a Young Lover
 S. Fowler Wright, The Life Of Sir Walter Scott, biography
 W. B. Yeats, Words for Music Perhaps, and Other Poems, Irish poet published in the United Kingdom

United States
 W. H. Auden, The Orators
 Sterling Brown, Southern Road
 Mary Elizabeth Frye, "Do Not Stand at My Grave and Weep"
 Langston Hughes, Scotsboro Limited, verse drama
 Robinson Jeffers, Thurso's Landing and Other Poems
 Archibald MacLeish, Conquistador
 Edward Arlington Robinson, Nicodemus
 Allen Tate, Poems: 1928–1931
 Sara Teasdale, A Country House
 William Carlos Williams, The Cod Head

Other in English
 Kenneth Slessor, Cuckooz Contrey, Sydney: Frank Johnson, Australia
 W. B. Yeats, Words for Music Perhaps, Irish poet published in the United Kingdom

Works published in other languages

France
 André Breton, Le Revolver a chevaux blancs
 Paul Éluard, La Vie immédiate
 Tristan Tzara, pen name of Sami Rosenstock, Où hoivent les loups

Indian subcontinent
Including all of the British colonies that later became India, Pakistan, Bangladesh, Sri Lanka and Nepal. Listed alphabetically by first name, regardless of surname:

Hindi
 Sumitranandan Pant, Gunjana, including many popular Hindi poems such as "Nauka Vihar", "Ek Tara", "Candni", "Madhuvan"
 Rama Nath Jyotisi, Mahabharat Mahakavya, epic Hindi poem based on the Mahabharata, with new interpretations of the episodes
 Mahadevi Varma, Rasmi, 35 Hindi poems of the Chayavadi romantic poetry movement in Indian literature

Other Indian languages
 Adibhatta Narayandas, translator, Rubaiyat, from Edward Fitzgerald's English translation into Sanskrit and Telugu, with the text in Persian and Roman lettering
 Anil, also known as "Atmaram Raoji Deshpande", Phulavat, the author's first book of poetry; mostly love poems; Marathi
 D. R. Bendre, also known as "Ambikatanayadatta", Gari, 55 poems, marked by an unusual level of abstraction, metrical experiments and metaphorical language; Kannada
 Mahjoor, Bagh e Nisata Kae Gulo, poem on the charms of the Dal Lake; Kashmiri
 Mathura Prasad Dikshit, editor, Govinda Gitavali, collection of Govindadasa's 17th-century devotional songs and others in the Maithili-language oral tradition
 Maulvi Abdul Haq, editor, Jangnamah-yi Alam Ali Khan, an 18th-century Urdu narrative poem (masnavi) published for the first time; includes introductory material
 Premendra Mitra, Prathama, the author's first book of poetry; Bengali
 Rabindranath Thakur, Punasca, in this and in some of the author's other books in the mid-1930s, he introduced a new rhythm in poetry that "had a tremendous impact on the modern poets", according to Indian anthologist and academic Sisir Kumar Das; Bengali
 Rallapalli Anantha Krishna Sharma, translator, translated from the Prakrit of Hāla's Gaha Sattasai into Telugu, in "ataveladi" meter; according to academic and anthologist Sisir Kumar Das, writing in 1995, the work "is still considered a model for poetical translation"
 K. Shankara Bhat, Nalme, three long narrative poems in Kannada on tragic subjects: Honniya maduve ("Marriage of Honni"), depicting village life in coastal Karnataka; Madriya Cite ("Pyre of Madri"), on the tragic end of Madri, wife of Pandu
 Shyamananda Jha, editor, Maithili Sandes, anthology of patriotic Maithili poetry
 T. N. Shreekantayya, Olume, Kannada work including translations from Greek and Pakrit

Spanish language

Spain
 Vicente Aleixandre, Espadas como Labios ("Swords or/as Lips")
 Miguel Hernández, Perito en lunas ("Expert in Moon Matters")
 María Pemán, Elegía de la tradición de Españia ("Elegy of Spain's Tradition")

Latin America
 Luis Fabio Xammar, Las voces armoniosas, Peru

Other languages
 Boris Pasternak, The Second Birth, Russia
 Sir Muhammad Iqbal, The Javed Nama (Book of Eternity) in  Persian, inspired by Dante's Divine Comedy
 Eugenio Montale, La casa dei doganieri e altre poesie, a chapbook of five poems published in association with the award of the Premio del Antico Fattore to Montale; Florence: Vallecchi; Italy
 Giorgos Seferis, Στέρνα (The Cistern), Greece

Awards and honors
 Pulitzer Prize for Poetry: George Dillon: The Flowering Stone

Births
Death years link to the corresponding "[year] in poetry" article:
 January 2 – Peter Redgrove (died 2003), English poet
 January 5 – Douglas Livingstone (died 1996), Malaysian-born South African poet
 January 19 – George MacBeth (died 1992) Scottish-born poet and novelist
 February 6 – Shankha Ghosh (died 2021), Bengali poet and critic
 February 12 – Hugh Fox, (died 2011), American novelist and poet, a founder of the Pushcart Prize
 March 18 – John Updike (died 2009), American novelist, short story writer, essayist, poet and writer
 April 10 – Adrian Henri (died 2000), English member of the Liverpool poets
 April 11 – Bienvenido Lumbera (died 2021), Filipino poet, critic and dramatist
 May 6 – Alauddin Al-Azad (died 2009), Bengali novelist, writer, poet, literary critic and academic
 May 7
 Jenny Joseph (died 2018), English poet
 Yadollah Royaee (died 2022), Iranian poet
 May 25 – Patrick Cullinan (died 2011), South African poet
 May 27 – Linda Pastan, American poet
 June 18 – Geoffrey Hill (died 2016), English poet and academic at Boston University
 June 29
 Philip Hobsbaum (died 2005), English teacher, poet and critic
 Ror Wolf (died 2020), German poet and writer
 July 10 – Martin Green (died 2015), English author, poet and publisher
 July 18 – Yevgeny Yevtushenko (died 2017), Soviet Russian poet and writer
 July 21 – Marie-Claire Bancquart (died 2019), French poet and critic
 August 16 – Christopher Okigbo (died in Biafran War 1967), Nigerian poet 
 September 18 – Henri Meschonnic (died 2009), French poet, linguist, translator and theoretician
 September 13 – Eugene Perkins, African-American poet
 October 9 – Seda Vermisheva (died 2020), Soviet Armenian-Russian poet, economist and activist
 October 17 – Rosemary Tonks (died 2014), English poet
 October 20 – Michael McClure (died 2020), American poet and playwright
 October 24 – Adrian Mitchell (died 2008), English poet and playwright
 October 27 – Sylvia Plath (suicide 1963), American-born poet and novelist (The Bell Jar)
 December 11 – Keith Waldrop, American poet, prose stylist, visual artist; with wife Rosmarie Waldrop, founding editor of the influential and innovative Burning Deck Press
 Also:
 Jergen Becker, German
 Linda M. Stitt, Canadian poet

Deaths
Birth years link to the corresponding "[year] in poetry" article:
 March 16 – Harold Monro, 53 (born 1879), English poet and proprietor of the Poetry Bookshop in London which helped many famous poets bring their work before the public
 April 8 – Hubert Church, 74 (born 1857), Australian poet
 April 27 – Hart Crane, 32 (born 1899), American poet, by suicide
 June 21 – حافظ إبراهيم Hafez Ibrahim, 60 (born 1871), Egyptian "poet of the Nile"
 August 29 – Raymond Knister, 33 (born 1899), Canadian novelist, short story writer and poet, drowned in a swimming accident
 October 5 – Christopher Brennan, 61 (born 1870), Australian poet
 October 14 – أحمد شوقي Ahmed Shawqi, 64 (born 1868), Egyptian poet
 November 19 – Clinton Scollard, 72 (born 1860), American poet
 December 18 – Edmund Vance Cooke, 66 (born 1866), Canadian American poet

See also

Poetry
 List of poetry awards
 List of years in poetry
 New Objectivity in German literature and art

Notes

20th-century poetry
Poetry